Phil Woods and his European Rhythm Machine at the Montreux Jazz Festival is a 1970 album by Phil Woods, produced by Johnny Pate.

Reception

Scott Yanow reviewed the album for Allmusic and wrote that Woods' European Rhythm Machine was "an adventurous unit that really challenged the altoist" and "one of the most underrated groups of the 1968-70 period". Yanow concluded that "It is very good to hear Phil Woods playing post-bop and almost avant-garde music for a change, but it is a pity that all of the intriguing group's recordings are currently out of print".

Track listing 
 "Capricci Cavaleschi" (George Gruntz) – 9:50
 "I Remember Bird" (Leonard Feather) – 10:15
 "Ad Infinitum" (Carla Bley) – 10:20
 "Riot" (Herbie Hancock) – 5:12

Personnel 
Phil Woods – alto saxophone
George Gruntz – piano
Henri Texier – double bass
Daniel Humair – drums
Johnny Pate – producer

References

1969 live albums
Albums recorded at the Montreux Jazz Festival
Albums produced by Johnny Pate
Phil Woods live albums
MGM Records live albums
Instrumental albums